Alter do Chão is a municipality in the District of Portalegre in Portugal. The population in 2011 was 3,562, in an area of 362.07 km2.

The present Mayor is Francisco Reis, elected by the Socialist Party. The municipal holiday is Ascension Day. The municipality is famous for its horsebreeding and high school of horseriding.

Parishes
Administratively, the municipality is divided into 4 civil parishes (freguesias):
 Alter do Chão
 Chancelaria
 Cunheira
 Seda

Notable people 
 Artur Pastor (1922 in Alter do Chão – 1999) a Portuguese photographer.

References

External links
Town Hall official website
Photos from Alter do Chão

Populated places in Portalegre District
Municipalities of Portalegre District